The Flame is an album by Steve Lacy which was released on the Italian Soul Note label featuring four of Lacy's compositions and one by Bobby Few performed by Lacy, Bobby Few and Dennis Charles.

Reception
The Allmusic review by Scott Yanow awarded the album 4½ stars stating "This adventurous music, with only a quartet [sic], falls along the lines of other brilliant efforts by the leader. On four Lacy originals and one by Few, the musicians tackle circular thematic group improvisations that are never aimless. By exploiting impressive technique and (just as importantly) open ears, the players constantly respond to each other and come up with fresh ideas. An intriguing set, worth the search."

Track listing
 "The Match" - 9:49
 "Wet Spot" (Bobby Few) - 4:27
 "Gusts" - 7:35
 "Licks" - 8:16
 "The Flame" - 13:11

All compositions by Steve Lacy except as indicated
Recorded at Barigozzi Studio, Milan, Italy on January 18–19, 1982

Personnel
Steve Lacy - soprano saxophone
Bobby Few - piano
Dennis Charles - drums

References 

1982 albums
Steve Lacy (saxophonist) albums
Black Saint/Soul Note albums